is an online manga and webtoon platform and smartphone app operated by Line Corporation. It originally launched with just licensed manga titles but soon expanded to include original webtoons.

Overview
Line first launched its manga service in 2013 offering licensed manga titles to purchase. One of the biggest features of the service was its integration with the Line messaging app, users could recommend and share manga titles with friends in the app, collect special stickers that were exclusive to titles bought on the service, and use Line's digital currency to buy titles. In 2017, Line Manga introduced the ability to read some manga chapters for free similar to the webtoon model it had used with its Naver Webtoon service. Naver, Line's Korean owner, in 2018 decided it would close down its Japanese service of Naver Webtoon (known as XOY in Japan) and merge it with Line Manga bringing with it not just its translated webtoons but also its domestic Japanese webtoons to the service.  Since its launch, it has grown to be the second most popular manga app in Japan behind Piccoma and has reached over 23 million downloads since its inception.

See also 
 Naver Webtoon
 Piccoma

References

External links
 

Webtoon publishing companies
Naver Corporation
Anime and manga websites
Internet properties established in 2013
Manga distributors